Cut the Body Loose is the fifth solo studio album by American hip hop artist Astronautalis. It was released via SideOneDummy Records on May 13, 2016. Music videos were created for "Sike!", "Running Away from God", and "Kurt Cobain". In the week of April 22, 2016, Consequence of Sound placed "Attila Ambrus" at number 8 on the "Top 10 Songs of the Week" list.

Track listing

Personnel
Credits adapted from liner notes.

 Astronautalis – vocals, production (11)
 Adam Pickrell – synthesizer (1–8, 11), bass guitar (2–5, 7, 8), organ (6, 9, 11), keyboards (9), production (10), piano (11)
 Icetep – production (1, 2)
 Reggie Pace – horns (1, 3, 6–11)
 Bird Peterson – drum programming (1, 10)
 Amati – production (2)
 Cecil Otter – production (3)
 John Congleton – drum programming (3, 5, 7, 8), production (9), engineering, mixing
 Steel Tipped Dove – production (4, 6)
 Oscar Romero, Jr. – vocals (5)
 Lazerbeak – production (5)
 Picnic Tyme – production (7)
 Mo McNichols – drums (8)
 Red Velvet Beats – production (8)
 Rickolus – production (9)
 Lizzo – vocals (11)
 Justin Vernon – executive production

Charts

References

Further reading

External links
 
 

2016 albums
Astronautalis albums
SideOneDummy Records albums
Albums produced by Lazerbeak
Albums produced by John Congleton